Maliki is a school of Islamic law.

Maliki or al-Maliki may also refer to:

Abu Bakr al-Maliki, historian
Nouri al-Maliki, a former prime minister of Iraq
Muhammad Alawi al-Maliki, Saudi scholar
Melkite, Middle-Eastern Christians
Məliki, Azerbaijan
 Another name for the dingo
Maliki, Iran, a village in Hormozgan Province, Iran
Jonas Maliki, Sense8 character

See also
Maleki (disambiguation), other places in Iran and a surname
Malikism (disambiguation)